Kauper or Käuper is a surname. Notable people with the surname include: 

Harry Kauper (1888–1942), Australian aviation and radio engineer
Ole Käuper (born 1997), German footballer 
Thomas E. Kauper (born c. 1935), American lawyer and legal scholar

See also
 Kaupers